The Totes Gebirge is a group of mountains in Austria, part of the Northern Limestone Alps, lying between the Salzkammergut and the Ennstaler Alpen. The name Totes Gebirge is derived from the German words tot meaning "dead", referring to the apparent lack of vegetation, and Gebirge meaning "mountain range". The area is a large karst plateau with steep sides, and several mountain peaks above 2000 m.

See also 
 Limestone Alps

References

 
Mountain ranges of the Alps
Northern Limestone Alps
Mountain ranges of Styria
Upper Austrian Prealps